Cerithidea rhizophorarum is a species of sea snail, a marine gastropod mollusk in the family Potamididae.

Description

Distribution

References

External links

Potamididae
Gastropods described in 1855